Ivan Archie Swinburne  (6 March 1908 – 12 August 1994) was an Australian politician.

He was born in Wangaratta to dairy farmers George Arthur and Hilda Maud Swinburne. He attended local public schools and became a dairy farmer in 1930. From 1940 to 1947 he was a member of Bright Shire Council, serving as president from 1943 to 1944. On 7 January 1950 he married Isabella Mary Moore; in 1951 they had a daughter, Janice.  He was elected to the Victorian Legislative Council in 1946 as a Country Party member for North Eastern. He was deputy leader of the Country Party in the upper house from 1954 to 1969 and leader from 1969 to 1976; he also served as Minister of Housing and Materials from 1950 to 1952. He was appointed Companion of the Order of St Michael and St George in 1973, and retired from politics in 1976. Swinburne died in 1994.

References

1908 births
1994 deaths
National Party of Australia members of the Parliament of Victoria
Members of the Victorian Legislative Council
Australian Companions of the Order of St Michael and St George
20th-century Australian politicians